The 2017 Nicky Rackard Cup was the 13th staging of the Nicky Rackard Cup hurling championship since its establishment by the Gaelic Athletic Association in 2005.  It is the third tier of senior inter-county championship hurling.

Mayo, the 2016 champions, were promoted to the 2017 Christy Ring Cup after defeating Derry in the promotion/relegation playoff 1–21 to 1–14.

Format

The 2017 Nicky Rackard Cup is played in a double-elimination format. For clarity, the match-ups are explained in each round below.

The seven teams competing in 2017 were  Armagh,  Derry,  Donegal,  Longford,  Louth,  Monaghan, and  Tyrone.  Fingal were scheduled to compete but withdrew for 2017.

Round 1

Six of the seven teams play in Round 1. The seventh team receives a bye.

Round 2

Round 2A

Contested by the three winners of Round 1 and the team that received a bye.

Round 2B

One match contested by two of the three losers of Round 1. The other losing team from Round 1 receives a bye.

Quarter-finals
 
The two losers of round 2A played the winner of round 2B and Monaghan, who had received a bye from that round. These two matches are referred to as quarter-finals.

Semi-finals

The winners of round 2A play the winners of the two quarter-finals.

Final

The winners of the Nicky Rackard Cup (tier 3) are automatically promoted to next year's Christy Ring Cup (tier 2).

Bracket

Relegation play-off (cancelled)

Normally contested by the two losers from round 2B as both these teams lost their first two matches. In 2017, no team was relegated as Fingal withdrew, thereby creating a vacant place in the normal eight-team Nicky Rackard Cup which was taken up by Warwickshire, the winners of the 2017 Lory Meagher Cup.

Scoring statistics

Top scorers overall

Top scorers in a single game

References

Nicky Rackard Cup
Nicky Rackard Cup